Jakob von Baden (6 June 1471 – 27 April 1511) was the Archbishop-Elector of Trier from 1503 to 1511.

Biography

Jakob von Baden was born at the Burg Hohenbaden in Baden-Baden on 6 June 1471, the second child and eldest son of Christopher I, Margrave of Baden-Baden and his wife Ottilie of Katzenelnbogen.  He studied Christian theology at the University of Bologna and the Sapienza University of Rome.

In 1490, Jakob von Baden became provost of St. Paulinus' Church in Trier; he became Domizellar the next year.  In 1497, he became a member of the cathedral chapter of Mainz Cathedral, and in 1498, a member of the cathedral chapter of Augsburg Cathedral.  

In 1500, Jakob von Baden's uncle, John II of Baden, Archbishop of Trier, had Jakob named his coadjutor archbishop, with the understanding that Jakob von Baden would succeed Johann von Baden as archbishop.  Pope Alexander VI approved this arrangement on 11 September 1500. Upon his uncle's death on 9 February 1503, Jakob von Baden became Archbishop of Trier.  He was consecrated as a bishop in January 1504.  During his time as archbishop, he reorganized the finances of the Archbishopric of Trier, supported the new University of Trier, and served as chair for several imperial mediations.

He died on 27 April 1511 in Cologne.  He was buried in the collegiate church of Saint Florian in Koblenz. On 25 June 1808 he was disinterred and his remains transferred to the family crypt of the House of Baden.

Ancestors

References

This page is based on this page on German Wikipedia.

1471 births
1511 deaths
James 02
Jakob of Baden
Sons of monarchs